Dmitry Fyodorovich Ayatskov (born November 9, 1950,) is a Russian politician, the head of administration (1996) and the Governor of the Saratov region (1996-2005).

In 2005, after the abolition of elections of regional leaders, President Putin did not propose the candidature of Dmitry Ayatskov to override the governor of the region. Instead, in March 2005 Ayatskov was appointed Russian ambassador to Belarus. However, on 19 July 2005 at a press conference in Saratov, which he gave after the receipt of agreement, that is an official agreement on the visit to Minsk as an ambassador, Ayatskov offered Belarusian President Alexander Lukashenko "stop blowing cheeks". These words caused a scandal, and the appointment did not take place.

In autumn 2005 there was information that Dmitry Ayatskov will take the post of the President of Russia envoy assistant of Volga Federal District. In early 2006, Ayatskov opened in Saratov public reception and started writing his memoirs.

In the autumn of 2006 he was appointed assistant Kremlin Chief of Staff.

March 24, 2014 was appointed advisor to the unit counselors and assistants of the Governor of the Saratov region Valery Radaev on Agrarian Issues.

References

External links
  Д. Ф. Аяцков на Dosye.Ru
 Д. Ф. Аяцков на сайте информационного агентства Взгляд-Инфо

1950 births
Living people
People from Saratov Oblast
Recipients of the Order "For Merit to the Fatherland", 2nd class
Recipients of the Order "For Merit to the Fatherland", 3rd class
Recipients of the Order of Honour (Russia)
Governors of Saratov Oblast
Members of the Federation Council of Russia (1994–1996)
Members of the Federation Council of Russia (1996–2000)
Ambassadors of Russia to Belarus
Communist Party of the Soviet Union members
Our Home – Russia politicians
20th-century Russian politicians
Honorary Members of the Russian Academy of Arts
Saratov State Agrarian University alumni